Sigma Phi Epsilon, commonly known as SigEp, is a social college fraternity for male college students in the United States. It was founded on November 1, 1901, at Richmond College, which is now the University of Richmond, and its national headquarters remains in Richmond, Virginia. It was founded on three principles: Virtue, Diligence, and Brotherly Love (often abbreviated as "VDBL"). Sigma Phi Epsilon is one of the largest social fraternities in the United States in terms of current undergraduate membership.

History

Founding
In the fall of 1900 18-year-old divinity student Carter Ashton Jenkens, the son of a Baptist minister, transferred from Rutgers College in New Brunswick, New Jersey to Richmond College, a Baptist institution in Richmond, Virginia. At Rutgers Jenkens had been initiated into the Chi Phi fraternity. At Richmond, which did not have a chapter of Chi Phi, Jenkens was part of group of friends who were meeting regularly under the unofficial name the "Saturday Night Club". By early October, 1901, Jenkens had persuaded the group, which had grown to twelve men, to try to establish a chapter of Chi Phi at Richmond. These men were reportedly spurned by the existing fraternities on campus for their sense of morality (seven of the twelve were studying for the ordained ministry) and for their rural, middle-class backgrounds. Jenkens had convinced the others that their chapter could be different from the other fraternities on campus and assured them that Chi Phi's principles were in line with their own. The group's request for a charter, however, was met with refusal as the national fraternity felt that Richmond College was too small to host a Chi Phi chapter. Jenkens and his friends therefore founded their own fraternity.

After several secret meetings throughout October 1901, the new fraternity took shape and on November 1, 1901, the fraternity's first membership roster was publicly posted at the school. It listed the twelve founding members in this order: Carter Ashton Jenkens, Benjamin Donald Gaw, William Hugh Carter, William Andrew Wallace, Thomas Temple Wright, William Lazelle Phillips, Lucian Baum Cox, Richard Spurgeon Owens, Edgar Lee Allen, Robert Alfred McFarland, Franklin Webb Kerfoot and Thomas Vaden McCaul. After much discussion, the group settled on a secret motto and called their fraternity Sigma Phi.

Jenkens, Gaw and Phillips then met with a faculty committee to seek official recognition for their new fraternity. The faculty members were reluctant to recognize a sixth fraternity in a school with only 300 students, especially as more than half the members would be soon-to graduate seniors. Additionally, another national fraternity already existed using the name Sigma Phi. The founders responded that their new fraternity would be different from the others at Richmond, as was being founded upon biblical, egalitarian principles, and new members would quickly be taken in from the undergraduate classes to increase the new fraternity's size, and the fraternity's name was still open to debate. With these assurances from the founders, the faculty committee approved the new fraternity's request for official recognition. Shortly afterwards, the founders met and decided to rename the fraternity Sigma Phi Epsilon.

Badge and colors
The colors dark red and royal purple were chosen to represent fraternity, while the golden heart was chosen as the fraternity's symbol. The principles of Virtue, Diligence and Brotherly Love, were chosen as "The Three Cardinal Principles". Jenkens also designed the fraternity's badge as a golden heart surmounted by a black enameled heart-shaped shield. Upon the shield are inscribed, in gold, the Greek-letters of the fraternity, ΣΦΕ, and below these letters, a skull and crossbones. The meaning of these symbols is divulged during the initiation ritual and known to members only. The founders' badges were designed and ordered before the addition of "Epsilon" to the fraternity's name. Thus they had only a "Sigma" and a "Phi" inscribed on the lobes of the heart, with the skull and crossbones below. A last-minute telegraph sent to the jeweler requested that an "Epsilon" be added "somewhere" on the already-complete badges, so the jeweler replaced the bottom-most gemstones with a black enameled "Epsilon." The badges of founders Carter and McCaul are on display at the Sigma Phi Epsilon headquarters at the fraternity's headquarters.

Chapter house doors are traditionally painted red. The tradition of the red door on Sigma Phi Epsilon Chapter houses began at Syracuse University (New York Alpha) in the 1920s. Brothers there painted the front door of their house red as a token of fraternalism, because it is a fraternity color. Today, all 260 SigEp chapters have red doors.

Acceptance of transgender members
In December 2014, Sigma Phi Epsilon became the first fraternity in the North American Interfraternity Conference to accept transgender men as members. The National Board of Directors passed the policy by an 8-0 majority vote with three abstentions.

Local chapter misconduct
In October 2022, the chapter at the University of Miami in Coral Gables, Florida was shut down after a video surfaced of chapter members chanting about having sex with a dead woman.

In January 2020, the chapter at Lamar University in Beaumont, Texas was shut down by the fraternity's national board of directors after hazing was reported to the university's leadership.

In September 2019, the chapter at the University of Nebraska Omaha was shut down by the fraternity's national board of directors due to multiple fraternal code violations.

In 2018, the chapter at Dartmouth College in Hanover, New Hampshire was shut down by the fraternity's national board of directors due to multiple fraternal code violations.

In 2017, the chapter at Auburn University was shut down after several serious allegations were made public about the behaviors of the chapter. As a result, the national office initiated a thorough investigation into the chapter which determined it was guilty of hazing, illicit drug use, and alcohol violations.

In October 2016, the chapter at the University of Wisconsin–Madison was shut down after repeated alcohol and safety violations. The fraternity was consistently cited for providing alcohol to underage students when hosting parties at their fraternity house.

In August 2016, member Daniel Drill-Mellum was sentenced to 74 months in prison after pleading guilty to two counts of rape.

In March 2016, the chapter at Purdue University was placed on suspension until 2020 for brutal hazing, alcohol violations, and non-compliance with university rules.

In September 2015, a Sigma Phi Epsilon member at the West Virginia University (WVU) was arrested for allegedly raping a WVU female student at the fraternity's chapterhouse. He faces up to 25 years of prison for the felony charge.

In October 2015, Sigma Phi Epsilon revoked the charter of the Jacksonville State University chapter due to hazing and other alleged actions including racism and sexual misconduct. The chapter was ordered to cease operations for three years and remove itself off-campus if the chapter was to be re-activated.

In September 2014, Tucker Hipps, of Clemson University in Clemson, South Carolina was found dead in Lake Hartwell after his pledge brothers reported him missing after a run that morning. Both the university and the national fraternity found that the chapter had violated its code of conduct. The investigation is ongoing. In February 2015, the Clemson chapter was given a five-year suspension for alleged violations of the student organization conduct code after the death of Hipps.

In February 2014, two sexual assaults were reported at the Yale University chapter house in New Haven, Connecticut one block from campus. The fraternity released a statement stating they had allowed their facility to be used by another student group for a private event. According to the fraternity, the allegations were not made against members of the chapter.

In January 2014, 178 grams of marijuana and .21 grams of cocaine were seized from the fraternity house at University of North Carolina at Chapel Hill. One fraternity member was arrested and charged for drug possession and intent to sell.

In 2014, the Sigma Phi Epsilon chapter of the University of Mississippi was closed after three of its members were found guilty of draping a noose around the statue of James Meredith, the first black student to attend the university. A thorough investigation of the chapter also uncovered the fraternity was guilty of brutally hazing pledges and providing alcohol to underage students.

In 2013, the fraternity was suspended for two years at Southern Methodist University in Dallas after torturing a Hispanic fraternity member of Lambda Chi Alpha for four hours. Four Sigma Phi Epsilon members were arrested and charged with assault for kicking, punching, spraying Formula 409 on wounds and cuts, making racist comments, and holding the Lambda Chi Alpha member captive against his will.

In December 2011, the chapter at the University of Vermont in Burlington, Vermont was suspended and heavily criticized for circulating a survey that asked fraternity members "If I could rape someone, who would it be?" Feminist groups on campus fought to have the fraternity permanently removed from campus for preying on women and encouraging sexual assault.

In August 2011, the National Board of Directors of Sigma Phi Epsilon voted to support criminal prosecution of anyone hazing members.

In 2011, three Sigma Phi Epsilon members from East Carolina University were arrested and charged with several offenses for possession of 49 grams of marijuana, three Adderall pills, and a dozen stolen street signs at their fraternity house.

In 2010, the fraternity at Florida Atlantic University in Boca Raton was suspended after sending a pledge to the hospital.  Pledges were "kidnapped" during a prank and their hands and feet were bound with duct tape. They were forced to chug beer and liquor out of a bowl and was sprayed with a squirt gun and colored on with markers.  No pledge decided to press charges against members of the fraternity for hazing violations.

In 2007, four members of the fraternity were arrested from Florida State University for hazing after police found 31 pledges shivering in 30 degree weather and covered in raw eggs, catfish-stink bait, flour and vinegar, and their bodies were red with welts.

In 2002, the chapter at Wake Forest University was suspended for several years after a "drunk, dehydrated and severely sunburned pig" was found at a park after the fraternity held an event there.

In 1997, the chapter at San Diego State University was shut down for several years after a pledge nearly died due to a hazing ritual.

Notable members

Chapters
 List of Sigma Phi Epsilon chapters

References

External links

 Official website

 
1901 establishments in Virginia
Active former members of the North American Interfraternity Conference
Student organizations established in 1901
Student societies in the United States